Anyang 1st Street is the commercial hub in Manan-gu, Anyang, South Korea. Anyang 1st Street is also the most crowded area inAnyang. Anyang 1st Street has underground shopping malls, a department store, many shopping stores, bars, restaurants, movie theaters, banks, bookstores, clinics, etc.

The Anyang Ilbang Street Shopping Mall was built by Jangyang Industrial Co., Ltd. in June 1982, and the Anyang Station underground shopping center was awarded D grade of disaster risk facilities as a result of precise safety diagnosis in 1999. Anyang City acquired it in 2002, In October 2004, it signed an agreement with Anyang Station Shopping Mall Co., Ltd. as a private invested company. It was completed in March, 2006 with the construction of remodeling and renovation work in November, 2004.A total of 43 billion won was invested in the project for one year and four months, and it was opened on April 15, 2006. It will be managed and operated by Anyang Station Shopping Mall for 22 years until 2028 and then Anyang City will take over. There are 415 stores in the underground shopping mall including 15,824 m2 (4,786 pyeong) including stores, public sidewalks, and other facilities, and 1,653 m2 (500 pyeong) on the 8th floor with 2 stories below the ground.

References

Manan-gu